William Frost (died c.1408), of York, was an English merchant and Member of Parliament.

By October 1390, Frost had married Isabel Gisburn, a daughter and coheiress of the York MP and merchant John Gisburn and his wife, Ellen.

He was a Member (MP) of the Parliament of England for City of York in 1399. He was Mayor of York 3 February 1396–8, 1400–4, 3 June 1406 – 3 February 1407.

References

14th-century births
1408 deaths
14th-century English people
15th-century English people
Lord Mayors of York
People from York
Members of the Parliament of England (pre-1707)